Katrina Nokleby is a Canadian politician, who was elected to the Legislative Assembly of the Northwest Territories in the 2019 election. She represents the electoral district of Great Slave, and she was elected to the territorial executive committee on October 24, 2019.  Until August 2020 her Cabinet portfolio included Minister of Infrastructure, Minister of Industry, Tourism and Investment, and Minister Responsible for the Workers' Safety and Compensation Commission, but was removed from such ministerial positions by Premier Caroline Cochrane sighting a “failure to manage her office”. On August 26, 2020 the Legislative Assembly voted 16 to 1 (with one abstention) to remove Ms. Nokelby from cabinet.

Ms. Nokleby was born in Matsqui, BC and currently resides in the Great Slave riding in Yellowknife, NT. Prior to moving to Yellowknife, Ms. Nokleby taught English overseas in South Korea for three one-year contracts. She used the time between work terms to travel within Asia including Cambodia, Japan, and China.

Ms. Nokleby has a Bachelor of Applied Science as a Geological Engineer.

Ms, Nokleby was a Councilor for the NT and NU Association of Professional Engineers and Geoscientists and was the President (2015-2017) and Secretary (2012-2014) of the Association of Consulting Engineering Companies in the Northwest Territories.

Since 2006, Ms. Nokleby has worked in Yellowknife as a consultant in the environmental, earthworks, and ice engineering fields where she travelled extensively to sites throughout the Northwest Territories, Nunavut, and Yukon.

Ms. Nokleby has been a leader with the Girl Guides of Canada since 2007, was the Director of YWCA NWT from 2015 to 2019, and has volunteered at a variety of local events in Yellowknife like Folk on the Rocks, Pride, North Slave Métis Fish Fry, Long John Jamboree, etc.

Ms. Nokleby enjoys travel, playing soccer and slopitch, board games and crosswords

References 

Living people
Members of the Legislative Assembly of the Northwest Territories
Women MLAs in the Northwest Territories
People from Yellowknife
21st-century Canadian politicians
21st-century Canadian women politicians
Year of birth missing (living people)